Sandnes is a village in Hadsel Municipality in Nordland county, Norway. The village is located on the island of Langøya on the northern shore of the Langøysundet strait, across from the town of Stokmarknes. The  village has a population (2011) of 350.

References

Hadsel
Villages in Nordland
Populated places of Arctic Norway